Sparta Sarpsborg may refer to:
IL Sparta, a sports club from Sarpsborg
Sparta Warriors, also known as IK Sparta Sarpsborg, the ice hockey department of IL Sparta
FK Sparta Sarpsborg (2004–2007), the predecessor of Sarpsborg 08 FF
FK Sparta Sarpsborg, the football department of IL Sparta